Anthony David Richmond (born April 1, 1987) is a former American football wide receiver. He was signed by the Cincinnati Bengals as an undrafted free agent in 2009. He played college football at San Jose State.

Early years
Richmond attended Garden Grove High school in Garden Grove, California, where he was a standout basketball player. During his senior year, he averaged 20.9 ppg and earned MVP honors in the 2005 Orange County All-star game.

College career

Junior college
After enrolling at Santa Ana College, Richmond took up football. He caught one pass in the only game he played in 2005. As a sophomore, Richmond developed into one of the top junior college receivers in America. He had 54 receptions for 842 yards and nine touchdowns. Rivals.com ranked him as the No. 53 junior college recruit in the class of 2007. He chose San Jose State over Idaho, BYU, Iowa State, Oregon and Wyoming.

San Jose State
In his first year at San Jose State, Richmond caught 55 passes for 852 yards and three touchdowns. He had three 100-yard games, including a 180-yard performance against Utah State in which he caught 10 passes and two touchdowns. As a senior, Richmond had 72 receptions for 832 yards and seven touchdowns to earn second-team All-WAC honors. He was the only San Jose State receiver with more than 25 receptions on the season, and his seven receiving touchdowns accounted for 58 percent of the Spartans production. After the 2008 season, Richmond was selected to play in the 2009 Texas vs The Nation All-Star Classic, where he had three receptions for 37 yards for the Texas team.

Professional career
Richmond was invited to the 2009 NFL Combine. After going undrafted in the 2009 NFL Draft, Richmond signed with the Cincinnati Bengals. He, along with fellow rookie Marlon Lucky, was waived on August 22. .

External links
San Jose State Spartans football bio
ESPN.com stats

1987 births
Living people
American football wide receivers
San Jose State Spartans football players
Cincinnati Bengals players
People from Garden Grove, California
Players of American football from Anaheim, California
Santa Ana Dons football players